Raymond Herrell "Buddy" Barker (March 12, 1936 – May 29, 2018) was an American Major League Baseball first baseman who played in all or parts of four seasons for the Baltimore Orioles in 1960, the Cleveland Indians in 1965, and the New York Yankees from 1965 to 1967.

Although Barker only played 192 games at the Major League level, with 68 hits in 318 at bats, he was an accomplished Triple-A player during his minor-league career, appearing for the Vancouver Mounties, Jacksonville Suns, Rochester Red Wings, Portland Beavers and Syracuse Chiefs and never failing to reach double digits in home runs. He retired after the 1967 campaign.

Barker died on May 29, 2018 at the age of 82.

References

External links

1936 births
2018 deaths
Baltimore Orioles players
Baseball players from West Virginia
Cleveland Indians players
Columbus Foxes players
Jacksonville Suns players
Knoxville Smokies players
Major League Baseball first basemen
New York Yankees players
Sportspeople from Martinsburg, West Virginia
Portland Beavers players
Rochester Red Wings players
Syracuse Chiefs players
Thetford Mines Miners players
Vancouver Mounties players